Fremontodendron californicum, with the common names California flannelbush, California fremontia, and flannel bush, is a flowering shrub native to diverse habitats in southwestern North America.

Distribution
It is found along the eastern San Joaquin Valley in the western foothills of the Sierra Nevada in chalky, sandy, nutritionally poor soils; on the east slope Cascade Range foothills of the northwest Sacramento Valley and the Klamath Mountains to the west; the California Coast Ranges throughout the state; the Transverse Ranges, and the Peninsular Ranges.

It is also found in small, isolated populations in the mountains of central and western Arizona, in the Arizona transition zone-Mogollon Rim region, primarily in the Mazatzal Mountains and Superstition Mountains. It is also found from central to northern Baja California state, in isolated chaparral locales in the Peninsular Ranges.

Description

The  leaves are olive to gray−green, fuzzy and flannel-like, palmately to pinnately lobed. The hairs covering the leaves are easily brushed off in human contact, and can be a skin and eye irritant.

They blossoms are borne in great showy masses, and tend to bloom one at a time. Each petal has an attractive, curved shape that comes to a point.

Taxonomy
Fremontodendron californicum is one of three species in the genus Fremontodendron, the others being Fremontodendron mexicanum and Fremontodendron decumbens.

Former subspecies

Subspecies have formerly included:
Fremontodendron californicum ssp. decumbens  — Pine Hill flannelbush:  reclassified as Fremontodendron decumbens (R. Lloyd).
In nature it only grows in metal-rich gabbro soil, a red weathered soil of volcanic origin. It requires fire for seed germination, but as the nature reserve is near human settlements fire ecology is suppressed. It is a federally listed endangered species.

Fremontodendron californicum ssp. californicum — California fremontia: now reclassified as the species, Fremontodendron californicum.
Fremontodendron californicum ssp. napensis — Napa Fremontia:  The current Jepson does not recognize this subspecies, using Fremontodendron californicum, but the form is different enough that it is horticulturally recognized by this name. It is typically smaller and more open in form than the species, with much smaller leaves and flowers.

Uses

Medicinal
As a traditional Native American medicinal plant, the inner bark's sap that was used as a topical remedy for mucous membrane irritation and for gastrointestinal upset, by some of the indigenous peoples of California. The wood was also used by the Californian Yokuts and Kawaiisu peoples as a building and furniture material, and the bark for cordage and for nets used in acorn cache holding and snare hunting.

Cultivation
Fremontodendron californicum is cultivated as an ornamental plant by specialty plant nurseries,  for planting in native plant, drought tolerant, and wildlife gardens, and in natural landscaping and habitat restoration projects.

Cultivated plants need good drainage, and no supplemental summer water when established. Fremontodendron californicum ssp. decumbens is the most garden tolerant of all Fremontia, and can also be used in large pots and planters.

Hybrids
There are several named hybrids of Fremontodendron californicum and F. mexicanum in the horticultural trade, they include:
It is the winner of the Award of Garden Merit from the California Horticultural Society in 1965, and received a First Class Certificate from the Royal Horticultural Society in 1967. 
A hybrid between Fremontodendron decumbens and Fremontodendron mexicanum.

Etymology
Fremontodendron is named for Major General John Charles Frémont (1813–90), an explorer of western North America. Californicum means 'from California'.

References

External links
USDA Plants Profile for Fremontodendron californicum (California flannelbush)
Jepson Manual Treatment of Fremontodendron californicum
 Calflora Database: Fremontodendron californicum (California flannelbush,  California fremontia, Flannel bush)
Fremontodendron californicum — UC Photo gallery
Lady Bird Johnson Wildflower database + gallery

Bombacoideae
Flora of California
Flora of Arizona
Flora of Baja California
Flora of Oregon
Flora of the Cascade Range
Flora of the Klamath Mountains
Flora of the Sierra Nevada (United States)
Natural history of the California chaparral and woodlands
Natural history of the California Coast Ranges
Natural history of the Channel Islands of California
Natural history of the Peninsular Ranges
Natural history of the San Francisco Bay Area
Natural history of the Santa Monica Mountains
Natural history of the Transverse Ranges

Plants used in traditional Native American medicine
Garden plants of North America
Drought-tolerant plants
Shrubs